Eros International plc was an Indian multinational global  mass media conglomerate. It generally works in the Indian film and entertainment industry. It co-produced, acquired and distributed Indian language films through its film production and distribution subsidiary, Eros International and distributes them in multiple formats worldwide. 
The group distribution network includes over 50 countries and has offices in India, the United Kingdom, the United States, the United Arab Emirates, Australia, Fiji and the Isle of Man. Kishore Lulla, the son of the founder Arjan Lulla, was the chairman of Eros International plc before its merger with STX Entertainment.

On 16 April 2020, U.S. film studio STX Entertainment announced that it would merge with Eros International to form Eros STX, in a transaction expected to close by June. The proposed merger was completed in July 2020, forming Eros STX Global Corporation.

Divisions and subsidiaries

Acquisitions and subsidiaries

Eros International Media

Eros's biggest subsidiary Eros International Media Ltd is one of the oldest companies in the Indian film industry to focus on international markets, and has aggregated rights to over 3,000 films in its library, including recent and classic titles that span different genres, budgets and languages. 
Eros' portfolio of films over the last three completed fiscal years comprised 197 films. In fiscal 2016, the company released 63 films in total either in India, overseas or both. These comprised 33 Hindi films, 19 Tamil films and 11 regional-language films. For fiscal 2016, the company generated aggregate revenues of $274.4 million derived from theatrical, television syndication and digital and ancillary distribution channels, globally.

Eros Now
Eros Now, the company's digital over-the-top (OTT) platform, has rights to over 5,000 films in Hindi and regional languages, and is focused on Indian films, music and original shows, with offline viewing and subtitles.  Eros Now has adopted a platform agnostic distribution strategy on Android and iOS platforms across mobile, tablets, cable or internet, including deals with original-equipment manufacturers (OEMs).

Recognition
Eros International plc became the first Indian media company to list on the Alternative Investment Market (AIM) of the London Stock Exchange. Subsequently, the company delisted from AIM in November 2013 to list on the New York Stock Exchange (NYSE:EROS).

References

External links

Film distributors of India
Hindi cinema
Mass media companies established in 1977
Film production companies based in Mumbai
Indian companies established in 1977
2020 mergers and acquisitions